Straight Time is a 1978 American crime drama neo-noir film directed by Ulu Grosbard and starring Dustin Hoffman, Theresa Russell, Gary Busey, Harry Dean Stanton, M. Emmet Walsh, and Kathy Bates. Its plot follows a lifelong thief in Los Angeles who struggles to assimilate in society after serving a six-year prison sentence. The film is based on the novel No Beast So Fierce by Edward Bunker, who also acts in the film.

Plot
Max Dembo (Hoffman), a lifelong thief in Los Angeles, is released from a six-year stint in prison and forced to report to a boorish and condescending parole officer, Earl Frank (Walsh). One of the conditions of parole is that Max find a job. At the employment agency, he meets young Jenny Mercer (Russell), a newly-hired secretary who helps him land scale-wage work at a can factory. Jenny accepts Max's invitation to dinner, clearly smitten by his worldly and seemingly gentle demeanor.

Earl pays a surprise visit to Max's room, finding a book of matches that Max's friend Willy Darin (Busey) recently used to cook heroin. Although Max clearly has no track marks or other signs of drug abuse, he is handcuffed and dragged back to jail, out of a job and a home. Jenny visits him in jail and gives him her number to call when he gets out.

After urine tests prove he is clean, Max is picked up by a smug Earl, who feels he actually gave Max a break by not pursuing the fact that someone had been using drugs in his place of residence, which would result in three more years in prison. During their car ride to a halfway house, Earl pushes Max to name the user. Max, realizing he will never get a break, pummels Earl, takes control of his car, and handcuffs him to a highway divider fence with his pants around his ankles.

This stunt now makes straight life impossible. Max returns to a life of crime, robbing a Chinese-owned grocery store and planning bigger heists with some willing old accomplices. After robbing a bank together, Max and his friend Jerry Schue (Stanton) decide to up the ante and clean out a Beverly Hills jewelry store. The job is botched when Max takes too long in trying to steal everything. Willy, acting as getaway driver, panics and takes off, leaving Max and Jerry to flee on foot as police converge on the store.

While the men attempt to hide in a residential backyard, Jerry is shot and killed, while Max shoots a police officer. Max escapes with the loot, settles the score with Willy by murdering him, and flees Los Angeles with a loyal Jenny by his side. While driving through the Antelope Valley, Jenny hears a news bulletin on the radio detailing the extent of Max's crime, and the various deaths that occurred. She becomes upset, and forces Max to stop the car so she can vomit.

A short time later, the couple arrive at a lone service station and diner near Palmdale. The two have drinks there, but Max has second thoughts as to their prospects on the lam, and implies that Jenny return to Los Angeles by bus. He decides to leave Jenny for her own good, resigning himself to a criminal life. Outside the diner, Jenny asks Max if he will call her. He says he wants to get caught, and drives away. The movie ends with a montage of his booking photos dating back to his teen years.

Cast

Production

Development
The screenplay was written by Alvin Sargent, Edward Bunker, and Jeffrey Boam, based on Bunker's novel No Beast So Fierce. Michael Mann served as an uncredited co-writer on the project.

Filming
Filming of Straight Time took place primarily in Los Angeles County, including Sylmar and Burbank, with additional photography occurring in San Bernardino. Principal photography began on February 9, 1977 at Folsom State Prison in Folsom, California, near Sacramento.

In addition to portraying the lead character, Hoffman was originally hired to direct the film, and, according to producer Jerry Ziesmer, completed one day in this role. Ziesmer recalled that the first day of shooting at Folsom State Prison consisted primarily of a basic establishing shot, and that Hoffman requested constant camera resets, resulting in not a single frame being captured by the days' end. With the studio concerned about Hoffman's ability to complete the project in a timely manner, Hoffman stepped down as director, after which Ulu Grosbard was hired.

Post-production
The film became the subject of litigation between Hoffman and the First Artists Production Company over creative control. Before Hoffman had finished editing the film, First Artists exercised a clause to take over the project since the shoot had gone 23 days over schedule and approximately $1 million over budget. Hoffman's lawsuit alleged that his right to the final cut had been violated and that the take-over clause did not mean he forfeited all creative control. First Artists' countersuit claimed that Hoffman's "derogatory statements" damaged the film's reception and box office performance. The outcome of the litigation has not been disclosed.

Release

Critical response
Vincent Canby of The New York Times praised Straight Time as "a leanly constructed, vividly staged film" that "makes no attempt to explain Max. It simply says that this is the way he is. It requires us to fill in the gaps, and it's the measure of the film that we want to." He also praised the performances, particularly those of Hoffman and Russell.

Gene Siskel of the Chicago Tribune gave the film four stars out of four and called it "a superior thriller, a riveting portrait of an ex-con," adding, "Most criminals in American movies are drooling, trigger-happy psychotics. In 'Straight Time,' the criminals are people, and, somehow, that's more disturbing ... Credit ultimately must go to Hoffman, who continues to avoid playing the million-dollar cardboard roles that so many of his peers are drawn to." At the end of the year he named it the best film of 1978. David Ansen of Newsweek wrote, "Though made up of familiar elements - an ex-con, bank robberies, lovers on the run - it is an unusual movie out of today's Hollywood and a very fine one. Small in scale, grittily realistic, charged with a fierce intelligence about how people live on the other side of the law, the film makes few concessions to an audience's expectations, but it has an edgy, lingering intensity."

Charles Champlin of the Los Angeles Times called it "riveting to watch from start to finish," adding, "Hoffman's Max has less dimension than some of his earlier characterizations. You wish his fight [to go straight] had gone on a little longer. But his cool, hard disillusion, his unsentimental realism and his fatalistic attitude toward a life that never got going makes its own impact." Arthur D. Murphy of Variety panned the film as "most unlikable" because Hoffman "cannot overcome the essentially distasteful and increasingly unsympathetic elements in the character. Ulu Grosbard's sluggish direction doesn't help." Gary Arnold of The Washington Post wrote that there were "authentic, gripping moments in the film" but "in some unavoidable way [Hoffman] just doesn't look threatening and ruthless. You're tempted to console him rather than run from him. The cunning and aggression that one might accept immediately if actors like Robert De Niro or Harvey Keitel were cast as Max are only theoretically apparent in Hoffman."

The film has a score of 82% on Rotten Tomatoes based on 11 reviews.

In 2003, The New York Times placed the film on its Best 1000 Movies Ever list.

References

Sources

External links
 
 
 

1978 films
1978 crime drama films
1970s heist films
American crime drama films
American heist films
Films directed by Ulu Grosbard
Films scored by David Shire
First Artists films
Films with screenplays by Jeffrey Boam
Films with screenplays by Alvin Sargent
American neo-noir films
Warner Bros. films
Films produced by Tim Zinnemann
1970s English-language films
1970s American films